Aiken is a rural unincorporated community lying in Rice Township in Jo Daviess County, Illinois, United States, near the Iowa border. It was originally established as a whistle stop around 1887, and lay along trunk lines of the Chicago, Burlington and Quincy Railroad and Chicago, St. Paul & Kansas City Railroad.(27 May 1901). Aiken, The Beautiful, Galena Daily Gazette(7 February 1888). Railroad Items, Galena Daily Gazette ("has been appointed agent at Aiken, the new station at the junction of the Chicago, St. Paul & Kansas City and the C. B. & N., about a mile and a half south of Galena Junction)  It is located at latitude 42.353 and longitude -90.415.

References

 

Unincorporated communities in Illinois
Unincorporated communities in Jo Daviess County, Illinois
Illinois populated places on the Mississippi River